is Chatmonchy's first single released under the label, Ki/oon.

Track listing

External links
 Official Chatmonchy Website

Chatmonchy songs
2006 singles